Felix Hall was a man from Alabama who, at age 19, was lynched, probably by fellow soldiers in Fort Benning, Georgia. A black man from Alabama, he had volunteered to join an African-American unit being trained in Fort Benning. He was last seen alive on February 12, 1941, in one of the fort's white neighborhoods. His body was found six weeks later, on March 28, hanging by a noose tied to a tree in a ravine near the Chattahoochee River.

The killers were never found, and evidence suggests that no serious efforts were made at the time by the Army or the FBI to discover the cause of Hall's death. Investigators first called the death a suicide, despite Hall's hands being tied, and later called it a sex crime.

In 2021, a plaque in Hall's memory was installed at Fort Benning. Congressman Sanford D. Bishop Jr., who represents the district where Fort Benning is located, said, "This memorial reminds us of our duty to assure equality and justice for all those who follow in Private Hall’s footsteps in service to our nation."

References

1941 deaths
Lynching deaths in Georgia (U.S. state)
History of Columbus, Georgia
African-American United States Army personnel